Ryul Tso and Kyun Tso are a system of twin lakes in Ladakh.

Geography 
The lakes are located about a mile from the Salsal La Pass (17062 ft.), on the way to Chumar, which marks the Indo-China boundary.

References 

Lakes of Ladakh